This is a list of Democratic Republic of the Congo writers.

 Léonie Abo (1945– ), autobiographical writer
 J'ongungu Lokolé Bolamba (1913–1990), poet
 Raïs Neza Boneza (1979– ), poet and peace researcher
 Amba Bongo, writer and advocate for refugees
 Lima-Baleka Bosekilolo, poet
 Maguy Kabamba (1960– ), writer and translator
 Christine Kalonji, French-language fiction writer
 Kama Sywor Kamanda (1952– ), writer and poet
 Charles Djungu-Simba Kamatenda (1953– ), journalist, teacher, publisher, and writer
 Paul Lomami-Tshibamba (1914–1985), novelist, born in Congo-Brazzaville
 Ngal Mbwil a Mpaang (1933– ), novelist
 Buabua wa Kayembe Mubadiate (1950– ), playwright
 V. Y. Mudimbe (1941– ), philosopher, academic and author
 Fiston Mwanza Mujila (1981–), novelist 
 Kavidi Wivine N'Landu, poet
 Mwema Ndungo, writer
 Clémentine Nzuji (1944– ), poet
 Sony Labou Tansi (1947–1995), novelist and poet 
 Frederick Kambemba Yamusangie, novelist, playwright and poet
 Lye M. Yoka, playwright and short story writer 
 Batukezanga Zamenga (1933–2000), novelist and essayist
 Sandra Uwiringiyimana (1994– ), human rights activist, author of How Dare The Sun Rise

References 

Congo, Democratic Republic of the
Writers
Congo, Democratic Republic of the